The James Semple House is a historic house on Francis Street in Colonial Williamsburg, Williamsburg, Virginia.  Built about 1770, it is a prominent early example of Classical Revival residential architecture, whose design has been attributed to Thomas Jefferson.  It was declared a National Historic Landmark in 1970.

Description and history
The James Semple House stands in historic Colonial Williamsburg, a short way south of the Capitol on the south side of East Francis Street.  It is a wood-frame structure, with a central two-story section flanked by single-story wings set at a recess.  The central block is covered by a front-facing gabled roof with full pediment, while the wings have side-facing gables.  The central block is three bays wide, with a center entrance topped by a transom window and sheltered by a gabled portico.  The portico is supported by Doric columns, and has a dentillated pediment and eaves.

The exact date of construction of this house is uncertain, but was probably around 1770.  Early owners of the house were the Harrison family, and Benjamin Harrison V sold it sometime before 1769 to Dr. William Pasteur.  Surviving documentation suggests that a house may have been standing on the lot when Pasteur acquired it, but it is also possible that Pasteur had the house built after purchasing the land.  Its designer is also uncertain, and has been ascribed by some authorities to Thomas Jefferson on the basis of its similarity to other known Jefferson designs.  The house was acquired in 1801 by Dr. James Semple.  Future U.S. president John Tyler, a relative of the Semples, resided here while attending school.  After passing through several other owners, it was purchased by Colonial Williamsburg in 1928.

At the time of its landmark designation in 1970, it was used by Colonial Williamsburg as executive housing.

See also
List of National Historic Landmarks in Virginia
National Register of Historic Places listings in Williamsburg, Virginia

References

External links

James Semple House, Williamsburg, Virginia, one photo at Virginia DHR

Historic American Buildings Survey in Virginia
National Historic Landmarks in Virginia
Houses on the National Register of Historic Places in Virginia
Houses in Williamsburg, Virginia
Houses completed in 1770
Colonial Williamsburg
National Register of Historic Places in Williamsburg, Virginia
1770 establishments in Virginia
Historic district contributing properties in Virginia